Atran, LLC is a cargo airline based in Moscow, Russia. It operates cargo charters in Europe, Russia and the CIS. Its main base is Domodedovo International Airport, Moscow.

History
The airline was established and started operations in 1942 as an Aeroflot agency, with the name Moscow Aviation Enterprise. The original function of the airline was to deliver spare parts for aircraft. In 1962 the airline had started operations of heavy freighters, and by the 1980 had a fleet of 29 covering the entire Soviet Union and changing its name to Transport Aviation.

In 1990, the company was created as the first independent airline in the Soviet Union and at the same time changing its name to Aviatrans. It became a private public limited liability company in 1993. In January 1997 the name ATRAN began being used.

Since 2011, Atran has been a subsidiary of Volga-Dnepr Group.

As of March 2022, ATRAN was forced to suspend all operations due to sanctions against Russia.

Fleet

Current fleet
As of January 2020, the Atran fleet consists of the following aircraft:

Previously operated
Atran has previously operated the following aircraft types:

Incidents and accidents
On 29 July 2007, an Atran Antonov An-12, registration RA-93912, crashed 4 km from Domodedovo International Airport after taking off on a flight on the route Moscow-Omsk-Bratsk, killing 7 crew members.

References

External links

Official website (Russian)

Airlines of Russia
Babyflot
Companies based in Moscow
Former Aeroflot divisions
Airlines established in 1942
Cargo airlines of Russia
1942 establishments in the Soviet Union